Rimberg is a locality in the municipality Schmallenberg in the district Hochsauerlandkreis in North Rhine-Westphalia, Germany.

The hamlet has 4 inhabitants and lies in the north of the municipality of Schmallenberg at a height of around 610 m. Rimberg borders on the villages of Sonderhof and Bad Fredeburg.

Gallery

References

Villages in North Rhine-Westphalia
Schmallenberg